The Francisco de Paula Santander University (Spanish: Universidad Francisco de Paula Santander) is a public, coeducational, research university based primarily in the city of Cúcuta, Colombia, with regional campuses in Ocaña, Colombia, Chinacota and Tibú.

It is the largest university in the state with more than 25,000 students. It offers 50 academic programmes, including 37 undergraduate degrees and 13 graduate degrees.

History 
The university was founded on July 5, 1962, later being accredited by decree #37 (1964) and decree #323 (1970).

The Francisco de Paula Santander University is an autonomous university with administrative and financial autonomy, working under the Ministry of National Education.

Location
Its main campus is located in Cúcuta, having a branch in the city of Ocaña and in the municipality of Chinacota. It also possesses several regional open education centers in municipalities of the departments of Norte de Santander, Cundinamarca, Santander, Cesar, Sucre, Bolívar, Magdalena, Arauca, and San Andrés y Providencia.

Academics

College of Engineering 
 Electromechanical
 Civil
 Mechanical
 Industrial
 Computer Systems 
 Electronics
 Mining
 Industrial
 Civil Work Technology
 Chemical Technology

Facultad de Educación, Artes y Humanidades 
 Law
 Communication and Journalism 
 Social Work
 Architecture
 Maths
 Natural and Environmental Science

College of Management Sciences 
 Business Administration
 Public Accounting

College of Health Sciences 
 Bachelors of Science Nursing
 Occupational Health and Safety
 Pharmacy Administration

Graduate programs:
 Health Administration and Audit Graduate Certificate
 Occupational Health and Safety Graduate Certificate

College of Agriculture 
 Biotechnological Engineering
 Agricultural Engineering
 Livestock and Animal Engineering
 Agro-industrial Production Engineering
 Farming Technology

References

External links 
 Official University Website
 Revista SI - Informática y Sistemas - UFPS

Universities and colleges in Colombia
Educational institutions established in 1962
Cúcuta
Buildings and structures in Norte de Santander Department
1962 establishments in Colombia